Florent Avdyli (born 10 July 1993) is a Kosovar professional footballer who plays as a central midfielder  for Kosovar club Drenica Skënderaj.

Career statistics

Club

Honours

Club
Teuta
Kupa e Shqipërisë: 2019–20,
Superkupa e Shqipërisë: 2020
Kategoria Superiore: 2020-21

References

External links
 
 

1993 births
Living people
Sportspeople from Pristina
People from Pristina
Kosovan footballers
Albanian footballers
Association football midfielders
Football Superleague of Kosovo players
Kategoria Superiore players
KF Hajvalia players
KF Feronikeli players
KF Trepça players
KF Liria players
KF Teuta Durrës players
Kosovan people of Albanian descent
Expatriate footballers in Albania
Kosovan expatriate footballers
Kosovan expatriates in Albania